Çamlıbel Sub-district is a sub-district of Girne District, Northern Cyprus.

References 

Girne District